The 1985 Copa Interamericana was the 9th. edition of the Copa Interamericana, played after a 6-year hiatus. The final was contested by Argentine club Argentinos Juniors (champion of 1985 Copa Libertadores) and Trinidad and Tobago team Defence Force F.C. (winner of 1985 CONCACAF Champions' Cup). Unlike previous competitions, the final was played as a single game. 

As its name said, the club from T&T was part of the local Defence Force with a solid defensive line that had helped the team finish with no goals conceded in the last CONCACAF competition.

The final was held in National Stadium in Port of Spain, where Argentinos Juniors beat Defence Force 1–0 with goal by Panamanian striker Armando Dely Valdés. Thus, the Argentine side won their first and only Copa Interamericana trophy. Besides, coach Roberto Saporiti equaled José Yudica as the most winning manager of the club, with two titles each.

Qualified teams

Match details 

|valign="top" width="50%"|

References

Copa Interamericana
i
c
i
i